A mobile commerce service provider (mCSP) is an organization (or company) that provides any combination of consulting, software and computer systems for mobile e-commerce platforms, mobile devices (cellular phones, smartphones), mobile commerce, mobile content or mobile web sites.

mCSPs supply businesses with the tools and services they need to distribute and sell products and services over both the Internet and Mobile Internet and manage their online enterprises. Specifically, these firms specialize in all aspects of mobile commerce, including for all digital goods (games, video, ringtones, wallpapers and applications) that are downloaded to mobile devices.

mCSPs provide service in areas such as 

 mobile device databases
 billing systems
 text messaging services
 hardware/software design
 mobile payments
 brand recognition
 distribution control
 Web site development and hosting
 Web site performance monitoring
 fulfillment management
 online marketing
 order processing and delivery
 Mobile app development

Providers of services to on-line companies